Mouloudia Club Oranais (MC Oran) is a football club based in Oran. The club was formed in 1946 by some of Algerian nationalists which decided to create à Muslim club to compete with the European clubs of the moments when Algeria was a French district (French Algeria).

This page is a season-by-season record of club's league and cup performance in national and international competitions.

Before independence
Below, the MC Oran season-by-season record before independence in the French Algeria period :

After independence
Below, the MC Oran season-by-season record after independence of Algeria :

Legend
Pts = points; P = play; W = wins; D = draws; L = losses; F = goals for; A = goals against; GD = goal difference; n.c. : not known

See also
MC Oran in African football

Notes and references

Notes

References

External links 
 MC Oran honours - mouloudia.com

Seasons
Oran